Wonga may refer to:

Species
 Wonga pigeon, a pigeon that inhabits areas in eastern Australia
 P. pandorana (wonga vine), a species of the genus Pandorea

Places in Australia

Queensland 
 Wonga, Queensland, a town in Queensland
 Wonga Beach, Queensland, a locality in Queensland

Victoria 
 Wonga, a town in South Gippsland Shire, Victoria
Wonga Park, Victoria, a suburb of Melbourne, Victoria
Arthurs Seat, Victoria, a mountainous and small locality, indigenous name Wonga

Other uses
 Wonga, a British slang term for money
 Simon Wonga (1824–1874), aboriginal elder
 2004 Equatorial Guinea coup d'état attempt or Wonga coup
 Wonga, a contest on the UK television show The Big Breakfast
 Wonga.com, a UK high-interest payday loan company

See also 
 Wunga (disambiguation)